Another Time and Place is the second major studio album by the American country music singer Rob Crosby. It was released on July 28, 1992 via Arista Nashville. The album includes the singles "She Wrote the Book" and "In the Blood".

Track listing
"She Wrote the Book" (Steve Bogard, Rick Giles) — 2:42 
"We'll Cross That Bridge" (Rick Bowles, Gary Burr, Rob Crosby) — 2:46
"Cold Day in Tennessee" (Burr, Crosby) — 2:55
"String of Bad Love" (Jim Sandefur) — 2:53
"Another Time and Place" (Crosby) — 3:14
"Tried and True" (Rick Bowles, Crosby) — 3:41
"In the Blood" (Bob DiPiero, John Jarrard, Mark D. Sanders) — 4:16
"You Can't Walk This Road Alone" (Austin Cunningham, Allen Shamblin) — 3:32
"Old News" (Rick Bowles, Crosby, Mac McAnally) — 4:07
"When Hearts Agree" (Kent Blazy, Crosby, Billy Dean) — 3:00
"I'm Down and She's Out" (Crosby, Thom McHugh) — 3:33

Personnel
 Eddie Bayers - drums
 Michael Black - background vocals
 Bruce Bouton - steel guitar, lap steel guitar
 Dennis Burnside - piano
 Gary Burr - background vocals
 Rob Crosby - acoustic guitar, lead vocals, background vocals
 Bill Cuomo - keyboards
 Stuart Duncan - fiddle, mandolin
 Jimmy Hall - background vocals
 Mac McAnally - background vocals
 Terry McMillan - percussion
 Don Potter - acoustic guitar
 Buck Reid - steel guitar
 Brent Rowan - electric guitar
 Mike Severs - electric guitar
 Pat Severs - lap steel guitar
 Harry Stinson - drums
 Willie Weeks - bass guitar
 Glenn Worf - bass guitar

Singles

References

Arista Records albums
Rob Crosby albums
Albums produced by Scott Hendricks